Jungleland is a 2019 American drama film directed by Max Winkler and written by Theodore B. Bressman, David Branson Smith, and Winkler. The film stars Charlie Hunnam, Jack O'Connell, Jessica Barden, Jonathan Majors, John Cullum, and Nick Mullen.

It premiered at the Toronto International Film Festival on September 12, 2019. It was released in a limited release on November 6, 2020, followed by video on demand on November 10, 2020, by Vertical Entertainment.

Plot 
Two brothers, Walter "Lion" Kaminski, a talented former professional boxer and his brother, Stanley Kaminski, an ex-con and Lion's idealistic manager, work menial jobs in a sewing factory. At night, the pair participate in underground boxing matches, squatting in a dilapidated house in the slums of Fall River, Massachusetts with their whippet, Ash. Stanley owes $2,000 to a local gangster called "Pepper" and in order to pay it off, Pepper allows the money to ride on Lion for their next fight. During the fight, Pepper shows up to watch and Lion realizes that Stanley bet on him to win. Lion angrily throws the fight. An enraged Pepper beats Stanley, but sees potential in Lion due to his skill. He proposes that they pay off the debt by completing a task: To drive a girl named "Sky" to Reno, Nevada and pay off their debt by having Lion compete in an underground prizefight called Jungleland in San Francisco's Chinatown. Having no choice, Stanley agrees and Pepper provides him with cash, an SUV, and a pistol. Along the way, they stop at a bar where Sky befriends Lion while Stanley has sex with a woman he met in their hotel. Sky stages a distraction and drugs Lion with a Xanax to steal the car keys before escaping. She accidentally crashes the SUV and tries to run before Stanley catches up to her. Locking her in their hotel room, he calls Pepper and demands answers. He is enraged to find out she is being delivered to a dangerous gangster called Yates, who Stanley has had dealings with in the past.

Sky pleads with Stanley and Lion not to take her to Reno, saying Yates will kill her but Stanley retorts by saying that Pepper will kill all of them if they don't. The trio take the SUV to a local garage, but they do not have enough money to pay for the repairs. While searching through Sky's wallet, Stanley finds out her real name is Mary McGinty and her family lives in Gary, Indiana. They take a taxi to meet her family to ask for money, posing as churchgoers to the strictly religious household. After insulting and demeaning Sky for the "sinful" path she's taken, her mother forces them all to leave. They squat in an abandoned school for the night, where Sky and Lion further bond, and Lion reveals the brothers' dream to open a dry cleaners. Sky questions the brothers' relationship, observing that Stanley treats Lion like a servant, not a brother, routinely putting him in harm's way, which Lion objects to. In the morning, the pair make their way back to the garage and make a deal with the mechanics to let them have the car if Lion beats two of them simultaneously in a street fight. A reluctant Lion agrees and handily beats the two. The trio drive across the country, stopping off to get lunch at a restaurant where Lion accuses Stanley of using him for his own benefit. Stanley is furious and reminds Lion of all the sacrifices that he has made in order to help Lion, but he retorts by revealing his arthritis and difficulty moving his hands and remembering events due to all the fighting he has done. Their outburst gets them kicked out of the restaurant when Ash begins to bark incessantly and Stanley gets punched by an irate customer and having the SUV towed.

With no money and no transport, Stanley sells Ash to a father and son from the restaurant without telling Lion, who attacks him. The three board a bus bound for Reno, but Lion and Sky get off at Carson City, Nevada, leaving a sleeping Stanley who wakes up in Reno and is kidnapped by Yates' men for not delivering Sky. At a bar, Lion implores Sky to run away with him, having fallen for her. Sky refuses and they have sex in the bathroom, where Lion realizes that Sky is pregnant with Yates' baby. She leaves, leaving Stanley's gun and some money with him, which he uses to go to Reno. Finding Yates' hideout, who has been torturing Stanley, he gets past his goons and executes Yates. A freed Stanley says that the pair can run away together and not have to go to San Francisco, but Lion is determined to fight at Jungleland. A reluctant Stanley goes with him and before the fight, he breaks down in tears, apologizing for all the hurt he has dealt on Lion. Lion forgives him and shows him a ring robe made by Sky as a parting gift, which Stanley is impressed by. The pair walk out to the ring, and Lion fights well, but is distracted and knocked down. A regretful Stanley pleads with Lion not to get up, saying that they can do something else with their lives, but Lion gets up regardless and wins the fight in spectacular fashion. However, the police raid the venue and Stanley decides to take the fall and allow the police to arrest him to give Lion a chance to get the money. Whilst Lion revels in his victory and Stanley is led away in handcuffs, Sky shows up at the venue and the two see each other as the credits roll.

Cast
 Jack O'Connell as Walter "Lion" Kaminski
 Charlie Hunnam as Stanley Kaminski
 Jessica Barden as Mary "Sky" McGinty
 Jonathan Majors as "Pepper"
 Owen Burke as Meadows
 Fran Kranz as Buck Noble
 Frank L. Ridley as Burly Father
 John Cullum as "Colonel" Yates
 Nick Mullen as Clay Carlson 
 Lucien Spelman as Roman
 Jere Shea as McGinty, Sky's Stepfather
 Margaret Devine as Pam McGinty, Sky's Mother 
 Patrick M. Walsh as “Lefty” DeNunzio
 James Perella as "Domo" Giomo
 Robert Otis as "Cue Ball"
 Bill Thorpe as Zeus
 Johnno Wilson as Reggie
 Scott Fielding as Milos
 Ed LaVache as The Referee
 Meredith Holzman as Darlene
 Michael Tow as Kind Father
 Joseph Oliveira as Joey (uncredited)
 Francis Radovanovic as Luke (uncredited)

Production 
Principal photography on the film began on August 27, 2018, in Taunton, Fall River and New Bedford, Massachusetts; Pawtucket, Rhode Island; Buffalo, New York; Gary, Indiana; Reno, Nevada and San Francisco, California.

Release
The film had its world premiere at the Toronto International Film Festival on September 12, 2019. In September 2020, Vertical Entertainment acquired U.S. distribution rights to the film. It is scheduled to be released in a limited release on November 6, 2020, followed by video on demand on November 10, 2020.

Reception
The site's critics consensus reads: "Thanks to muscular work from director/co-writer Max Winkler and his stars, Jungleland punches above its weight in a crowded genre." On Metacritic, the film has a weighted average score of 53 out of 100, based on 15 critics, indicating "mixed or average reviews".

References

External links 
 

2019 films
2019 drama films
American drama films
Films scored by Lorne Balfe
Films shot in Buffalo, New York
Films shot in Indiana
Films shot in Massachusetts
Films shot in Nevada
Films shot in San Francisco
Scott Free Productions films
Vertical Entertainment films
Films directed by Max Winkler
2010s English-language films
2010s American films